Wu Han (吴菡) (born February 19, 1959) is a Taiwanese-American pianist and influential figure in the classical music world.  Leading a multifaceted career, she has risen to international prominence through her activities as a concert performer, recording artist, educator, arts administrator, and cultural entrepreneur. She is currently the Co-Artistic Director of the Chamber Music Society of Lincoln Center, and Music@Menlo Chamber Music Festival and Institute in California and Co-Founder of ArtistLed. She also serves as Artistic Advisor for Wolf Trap’s Chamber Music in the Barns series and the Society of the Four Arts in Palm Beach.

Career
Wu Han began her musical studies in Taipei, Taiwan at the age of nine. In addition to the piano, she studied two other Chinese instruments, viola and percussion. By 12, Wu Han was playing concerts, and competing and winning competitions. Within a few years, she had captured first prizes in all of Taiwan's major competitions. At the invitation of The Hartt School in Connecticut, she traveled to America in 1981 to continue her studies with a double major in viola and piano. Wu Han studied with Raymond Hanson, Rudolf Serkin, Herbert Stessin, Lillian Kallir, and Menahem Pressler and attended the Marlboro Music School and Festival for two summers.

Wu Han has gone on to perform on the world's leading stages including Carnegie Hall, Lincoln Center, Washington's Kennedy Center, and Wigmore Hall in London.  She collaborates with a wide array of artists and ensembles including the Borromeo String Quartet, Emerson String Quartet, Escher String Quartet, and St. Lawrence Quartet.

In recent years, Wu Han's repertoire has expanded to include numerous works by a cadre of leading composers.  Works have been commissioned for and dedicated to Wu Han and cellist David Finckel from Bruce Adolphe, Lera Auerbach, Gabriella Lena Frank, Pierre Jalbert, Augusta Read Thomas, and George Tsontakis, and music by several of these composers is featured on ArtistLed's 'For David and Wu Han' album.

Partnership with David Finckel 
Wu Han performs and records frequently in collaboration with cellist David Finckel, whom she married in 1985.  Since the 1990s, the two artists have toured widely year-round and have emerged as one of the most popular cello-piano duos on the musical scene today. Wu Han and David Finckel regularly perform on all of the major chamber music series in the United States, as well as across Europe and Asia. They also appear regularly in trio performances with violinist Philip Setzer, clarinetist David Shifrin, and as a piano quartet with violinist Daniel Hope and violist Paul Neubauer. In an award ceremony in New York in 2012, they received Musical America's Musicians of the Year award.

ArtistLed
In addition to her distinction as an accomplished performer, Wu Han has established a reputation for her dynamic and innovative approach to the recording studio.  In 1997, Wu Han and David Finckel launched ArtistLed, classical music's first musician-directed and Internet-based recording company, whose catalog of twenty-three albums has won widespread acclaim.  BBC Music Magazine saluted the launch by featuring the company's debut album on the cover.  Wu Han is a controlling participant in every aspect of the recording process, from selecting the repertoire and recording venue to setting the sound, running the sessions, constructing the edits, and determining the final mix. ArtistLed's Grammy-award-winning recording engineer is Da-Hong Seetoo.

Music@Menlo
In 2003, together with cellist David Finckel, Wu Han co-founded Music@Menlo, an annual chamber music festival and institute in Silicon Valley that brings to the San Francisco Bay are a lineup of accomplished musicians, scholars, educators, and musicologists, as well as a roster of gifted young artists, for an immersive three-week chamber music experience in the summer.

The $2.2 million annual budget supports over sixty-five public events each year; total annual attendance now exceeds 13,000 with free program attendance exceeding 6,000; nearly 300 artists have come from all over the world to perform in the main-stage concerts, lead multimedia Encounter lectures, coach students of the Chamber Music Institute, and work with Menlo School students in the annual Winter Residency; 477 Chamber Music Institute participants have enrolled in the program to date; and 318 interns have gained real-world professional experience from Music@Menlo's industry-leading Arts Administration Internship Program.

Wu Han was instrumental in the formation of Music@Menlo's innovative live recording series, Music@Menlo LIVE, which commercially releases live recordings from the festival each year. The label was launched in 2004 and has been praised as "probably the most ambitious recording project of any classical music festival in the world" (San Jose Mercury News). Over 130 live recordings have been released to date.

Performances from the festival air nationwide on American Public Media's Performance Today, the largest daily classical music program in the United States, which airs on 260 stations and reaches more than one million people each week.

In 2002, Wu Han developed and trademarked AudioNotes, an innovative complement to program notes.  The listener guides are designed to offer audiences engaging introductions to many of the concert programs presented over the years.

The Chamber Music Society of Lincoln Center
In 2004, Wu Han and David Finckel were appointed Artistic Directors of the Chamber Music Society of Lincoln Center in New York City, where they currently present around 200 concerts, lectures, master classes, and outreach events each season. The Chamber Music Society is recognized as one of the leaders in the field of chamber music in North America. In 2021, Finckel & Wu Han were invited to extend their appointment for a fourth five-year term, the longest tenure since that of founding Artistic Director Charles Wadsworth.

Since becoming Co-Artistic directors, the projects they have directed and initiated include: programming the CMS seasons; expansion of the Bowers Program (formerly known as CMS Two); the creation and growth of CMS recording labels; international partnerships and expanded touring; establishing performance and educational residencies across the United States; commissioning more than 50 new works by emerging and established composers; and awarding of CMS's Stoeger Prize for composition; creation and expansion of the CMS's online presence via live-streaming expanded national radio broadcasts to 52 shows per year; and the creation of new series such as Late Night Rose and the Quartet Series.

They have also directed their attention to expanding the organization's activities internationally with the establishment of residencies and concert series, including the Mecklenburg–Vorpommern Festspiele in Germany; Wigmore Hall in London; Teatro Mayor in Bogota, Colombia; and Bach Inspiration in Taipei, Taiwan,

In the United States, the residencies they have established include the Isabella Stewart Gardner Museum in Boston, MA; Harris Theater in Chicago, IL; St. Cecilia Music Center in Grand Rapids, MI; the University of Georgia in Athens, GA; the Performing Arts Center at Purchase College in Purchase, NY; Saratoga Performing Arts Center in Saratoga Springs, NY; the Chrysalis Chamber Music Institute at the University of North Carolina School of the Arts in Winston-Salem, NC; and Shaker Village in Pleasant Hill, KY.

Other Artistic Partnerships 
Wolf Trap Foundation for the Performing Arts appointed Wu Han Artistic Advisor for the Chamber Music in the Barns in 2018, and she continues to curate the series today. Wu Han also serves as Artistic Advisor for Classical Music for the Society of the Four Arts in Palm Beach.

Intent on expanding the presence of chamber music in Asia, in 2011, Wu Han assumed the Co- Artistic Directorship of Chamber Music Today with David Finckel. From 2011-2018; the annual chamber music festival and institute presented the world's greatest chamber musicians to the Far East at venues including the IBK Chamber Hall of the new Seoul Arts Center in Seoul, South Korea.

Educational Activities
Wu Han's fervent commitment to nurturing the careers of countless young artists has led her to take on an array of education initiatives.

In 2004, Wu Han and David Finckel created the Chamber Music Institute at Music@Menlo. The institute offers a rigorous professional training ground and a wide array of performance opportunities to gifted young musicians who have been selected from conservatories, youth orchestras, and music programs nationally and internationally.

In 2009, under the auspices of The Chamber Music Society of Lincoln Center, Wu Han and David Finckel established chamber music training workshops for young artists in Korea and Taiwan, intensive residency programs designed to bring student musicians into contact with an elite faculty of artists including pianist Leon Fleisher and violinist Arnold Steinhardt.

As Co-Artistic Director of The Chamber Music Society of Lincoln Center, Wu Han has been instrumental in the expansion of The Chamber Music Society of Lincoln Center's Bowers Program (formerly the CMS Two program), that invites outstanding young musicians from around the world through audition to join the CMS artist roster for an extended residency that includes both performance and educational outreach opportunities. Under her leadership, the residency program has expanded from two to three years, and she greatly increased the level of participation of these young artists.

Wu Han has presented master classes at venerable institutions throughout the world, and for many years taught alongside the late Isaac Stern at Carnegie Hall and the Jerusalem Music Centre. She has also served as a member of the Artist-Faculty at the Aspen Music Festival and School for many years, and in 2013 established The Finckel-Wu Han Chamber Music Studio, which ran two weeks each summer through 2019.

Media
Wu Han has been the subject of numerous articles around the globe in publications including The Wall Street Journal, The New York Times, Los Angeles Times, San Francisco Chronicle, Toronto Star, New York Newsday, The Mercury News, The Strad, BBC Music Magazine, San Francisco Classical Voice, Concerti Magazine, Music Matters, Musical America, and Tokyo's Ongaku-no-Tomo. On television, she has appeared on NBC Nightly News, Channel 13 New York Voices and PBS's AHA! A House for the Arts, and has also been a frequent guest on American Public Media's Performance Today, Saint Paul Sunday, and other popular classical radio programs.

Personal life
Wu Han divides her time between New York City and Westchester County with her husband and musical partner, cellist David Finckel. They have one daughter, Lilian Finckel.

Discography
 Winterreise (2020)
 Wu Han LIVE III (2019)
 Bach, Mendelssohn, Debussy, Britten (2018)
 Wu Han LIVE II (2016)
 Romantic Piano Quartets (Brahms, Schumann, Mahler) on Deutsche Grammaphon with Daniel Hope, Paul Neubauer and Wu Han (2015)
 Wu Han LIVE (2014)
 Dvorak Piano Trios with Philip Setzer and David Finckel (2012)
 Clarinet Trios with David Shifrin and David Finckel (2011)
 Mendelssohn: The Piano Trios with Philip Setzer and David Finckel (2011)
 For David and Wu Han (contemporary works composed for David Finckel and Wu Han) (2009)
 Schubert Piano Trios with Philip Setzer and David Finckel (2008)
 Derek Han plays Mozart, with Wu Han, Peter Asimov, and the Royal Philharmonic Orchestra (2008)
 Russian Recital (featuring solo piano works by Tchaikovsky, Rachmaninov, and Skryabin) (2007)
 CMS Studio Recordings: Elgar and Walton (2007)
 CMS Studio Recordings: Beethoven and Dvořák (2007)
 DG Concerts: Bartok/Dvořák (2007)
 Brahms Sonatas (2005)
 Schubert Sonatas (2004)
 Edwin Finckel: Music For Cello (2001)
 Russian Classics (2001)
 Beethoven: Complete Works for Piano & Cello (1998)
 Sonatas by Strauss, Franck, and Finckel (1997)
 Sonatas by Tchaikovsky and Kodály with Da-Hong Seetoo and David Finckel (1997)
 Sonatas by Grieg, Schumann, and Chopin (1997)

References

External links 
 David Finckel and Wu Han – Official Website
 ArtistLed – Official Website
 Chamber Music Society of Lincoln Center - Bio
 Chamber Music Society of Lincoln Center – Artist Profile
 Music@Menlo - Artistic Directors Profile
 Classical Archives Interview with David Finckel

1959 births
American classical pianists
Male classical pianists
American women classical pianists
American classical musicians of Chinese descent
American musicians of Taiwanese descent
American women musicians of Chinese descent
Aspen Music Festival and School faculty
Living people
University of Hartford Hartt School alumni
Taiwanese emigrants to the United States
20th-century American pianists
20th-century American women pianists
21st-century classical pianists
Women music educators
21st-century American women pianists
21st-century American pianists
20th-century American male musicians
21st-century American male musicians